The British Quiz Championship (BQC), also termed the British Quizzing Championship, is a quiz competition in the United Kingdom. The current competition has been organised since 2004 by Chris Jones' and IQA-CEO Jane Allen's company Quizzing Ltd. Early in 2011 the re-launch of the quizzing.co.uk website saw it rebranded as the home of the British Quiz Association.

Before 2004 there had already been some sort of "British Championship" since 1999 run first only by Trevor Montague then by the British Quiz Association (see that page for champions), but after internal strife and a fall in interest in 2003/2004 (see attendance in the BQA links) the old BQA-management gave up and the only British Quiz Championship now is this one run by Quizzing Ltd.

British Quizzing Championship Roll of Honour since 2004

2004 - Venue Old Trafford Manchester - Winner Kevin Ashman 

The 2004 British Quiz Championship was run in 2004 as part of the World Quizzing Championship - as staged at various worldwide locations, such as Old Trafford Stadium on 3 July 2004), 

The 2004 event saw 67 entrants at Old Trafford who were joined, in the international event, by several hundred other Quizzers from countries such as Belgium, Estonia, the Netherlands, India and Malaysia quizzing in places such as Bangalore and Kuala Lumpur.

Both the 2004 British and World events were won by England's Kevin Ashman.

2005 - Venue Altrincham - Winner Kevin Ashman 

Having won the 2005 MSN Search sponsored World Quizzing Championships on 2 July Kevin Ashman went on to retain his British title later that year.

2006 - Venue Boreatton Park, Shrewsbury - Winner Kevin Ashman 

Kevin Ashman made it a hat-trick of British Championships in 2005. In a field of 41 competitors Ashman won by 21 points from Mark Bytheway and Pat Gibson in joint second position. A full report on the event is available here

2007 - Venue Derby Conference Centre - Winner Pat Gibson 

The absence of the previous winners and runners up for the last two years (Kevin Ashman and Mark Bytheway) left the field wide open. Pat Gibson emerged victorious, adding the British title to the World title he had also taken from Ashman earlier in the year. Gibson's margin of victory over Bjortomt was 12 points.

A full report is available here.

2008 - Venue Staveley - Winner Sean Carey 

A field of 61 competitors including Kevin Ashman (3 time British Champion, past World and European Champion), Mark Bytheway (2008 World Quiz Champion), Pat Gibson (2007 World and British Champion) met at Staveley in Derbyshire. With such a strong field of competitors it was perhaps a surprise that it was Sean Carey who took the title, beating second placed Kevin Ashman by 8 points. Ranked 19th before the start of the event, Carey is the lowest ranked competitor to win the British title, and the first person from outside the top 3. That said, he was likely ranked lower than he ought to have been on account of his not being able to attend as many ranking events as his peers. When he has competed in Grands Prix he has typically been placed in the top 10 of finishers.

2009 - Venue Derby Conference Centre - Winner Mark Bytheway 

All the big players were in attendance for this one, including every former winner of the title. For the first time ever the event had to be settled on a tie-break, Kevin Ashman and Mark Bytheway being neck-and-neck, 8 points ahead of Pat Gibson in third place. Reference was had to the players' discarded scores (both in Sport & Games) with Bytheway emerging victorious by a margin of one point (170 to 169 out of 240). Byethway's achievement was well received by the field of 62, not least because he is still recovering from surgery undertaken after he was struck with a life-threatening illness. Kevin Ashman was typically magnanimous in defeat. He now holds 'just' the World and European individual titles!

There was a first in the Pairs event, Kathryn Johnson partnering David Lea to a win. In so doing she becomes the first woman to hold a Championship title on the UK quiz circuit. Like the Individual event, the Pairs saw a tie, which had to be decided on 'countback'. The unlucky Pair who finished as runners-up were Chris Quinn and Mark Kerr.

2010 - Venue Derby Conference Centre - Winner Pat Gibson 

Pat Gibson regained the title he first won in 2007 and was the first to get his hands on the new Mark Bytheway Trophy, named in memory of last year's winner who died in July 2010. The trophy is to be inscribed with the names of former winners. This year's questions were written by former (BQA/Montague era) champion, John Wilson (since 2006 they have been composed by Quizzing.co.uk's principal setter Chris Jones).

In the Pairs event, 2008 winners David Edwards and Nic Paul became the first duo to regain the title. Second place went to Jesse Honey & Sean Carey and third to Kevin Ashman & Pat Gibson.

2011 - Venue Cathedral Lodge Hotel, Lichfield - Winner Kevin Ashman 

John Wilson again wrote the questions for the individual championship, which for the first time was held in 2 venues, the main one in Lichfield but with some players taking part in a venue in Normandy. 
Kevin Ashman won with a score of 158 out of a maximum 210, a full 24 points ahead of defending champion Pat Gibson.

In the Pairs event, Ian Bayley and Pat Gibson repeated their win of 2006.

External links
BQC 2010 and 2011 results in full
BQC 2009 report
Winners under "BQC", left side

Quiz games
Competitions in the United Kingdom
2004 establishments in the United Kingdom
Recurring events established in 2004
National championships in the United Kingdom